José Lifante is a Spanish stage, film and television actor.

Selected filmography
 Spanish Fly (1975)
 Butterfly on the Shoulder (1978)
 National Heritage (1981)
 Panic (1982)

References

Bibliography
 Harris M. Lentz. Science Fiction, Horror & Fantasy Film and Television Credits: Filmography. McFarland, 2001.

External links

1943 births
Living people
Spanish male film actors
Spanish male television actors
Male actors from Barcelona